Herman Adolf Ludvig Ahlsell (4 October 1919 – 18 October 1994) was a Swedish director and actor.
Ahlsell studied at the Dramatens Elevskola from 1938 to 1940. He is the father of Puck and Tom Ahlsell.

Filmography

References

External links 

1919 births
1994 deaths
People from Danderyd Municipality
20th-century Swedish male actors
Swedish male film actors